The men's 100 metre breaststroke event at the 1980 Summer Olympics in Moscow was held on 21 and 22 July at the Swimming Pool at the Olimpiysky Sports Complex.

Records
Prior to this competition, the existing world and Olympic records were as follows.

Results

Heats

Final

References

B
Men's events at the 1980 Summer Olympics